Bocholtz (Ripuarian:   is a town in the Dutch province of Limburg. It is a part of the municipality of Simpelveld, and lies about 7 km southwest of Kerkrade. Until 1982, it was a separate municipality.

History 
Bocholtz dates back to the Roman era. A Roman villa was found in the Vlengendaal, a street of Bocholtz, in 1911. A farmer plowing his land found a Roman sarcophagus in October 2003.

Architecture and buildings

Castle De Bongard 
The Castle De Bongard dates from the 16th century. The current building only represents 1/4 of the original building. The rest was destroyed during the invasion by the French during the Napoleonic Wars.

Hoeve Overhuizen 
Hoeve Overhuizen is a fortified farm with roots dating back as far as the 13th century.

From 2015 Rabobank moves in after redecorating the interior of the building to make it their regional headquarters.

Church 
The James the Greater Church was built between 1869 and 1873 by architect Pierre Cuypers. Construction workers expanding the church in 1953 found the remains of a building from the late medieval period on the same site. The patron saint of the church is St. James, son of Zebedee.

Regional language 
Bocholtz is part of the Netherlands and therefore the official language is Dutch. A lot of people also speak Bocholtzer, a Southeast Limburgish dialect that is linguistically Ripuarian but commonly perceived as a Limburgish dialect.

Gallery

References 

Populated places in Limburg (Netherlands)
Former municipalities of Limburg (Netherlands)
Simpelveld